Wadi Abadilah is a wadi in Fujairah, United Arab Emirates, which runs North East towards the coast at Dibba. At Masafi, it forms a confluence with the Wadi Ham, which runs South East towards Fujairah City.

See also 
 List of wadis of the United Arab Emirates

References 

Rivers of the United Arab Emirates
Geography of the Emirate of Fujairah